Dmitrikovo is a rural locality (a village) in Sergeikhinskoye Rural Settlement, Kameshkovsky District, Vladimir Oblast, Russia. The population was 19 as of 2010.

Geography 
Dmitrikovo is located on the Pechuga River, 18 km west of Kameshkovo (the district's administrative centre) by road. Zauichye is the nearest rural locality.

References 

Rural localities in Kameshkovsky District